St. Francis of Assisi Cathedral is a Catholic cathedral located in Metuchen, New Jersey, United States. It is the seat of the Diocese of Metuchen.

History

St. Francis of Assisi Parish

St. Francis began as a small frame mission church built in 1871 and dedicated to St. Joseph.  St. Francis Parish was incorporated in that same church on January 26, 1878.  A fire destroyed the church building on December 21, 1903.  The second church, also built of wood, was dedicated in December 1904.  Columbia Hall was built in 1920.

The parish grew to more than 2,000 families by 1960 and the pastor, the Rev. John J. Foley had plans made for a new church.  Columbia Hall was destroyed in a fire at this time and the plans were changed to include a parish hall and gymnasium as well.  The rectory was completed in June 1961 and the ground breaking for the new church began on July 24 of the same year.  Masses were held in various locations until the CYO Hall was completed in December  1961.  The present church was dedicated on May 19, 1963.

St. Francis of Assisi Cathedral 
On November 19, 1981 Pope John Paul II established the Diocese of Metuchen. St. Francis was chosen as the cathedral for the new diocese.

On April 30, 2019, St. Michael's Choir School sang at Saint Francis of Assisi Cathedral as part of their 2019 New York Tour.

Architecture
The Cathedral of St. Francis was built in the Gothic Revival style and seats about 1,000 people.  The interior walls are composed of limestone with marble wainscotting.  The floors are terrazzo and the woodwork is oak.  The altars are carved from Italian marble.  A bronze crucifix is above the altar as a part of the baldacchino.  The facade features a rose window

Rectors
The following priests have served as the rector of St. Francis of Assisi Cathedral since 1981:

Msgr. Dominic Turtora
Msgr. Richard A. Behl
Msgr. Michael J. Alliegro
Msgr. Robert J. Zamorski

See also
List of Catholic cathedrals in the United States
List of cathedrals in the United States

References

External links

Official Cathedral Site
Diocese of Metuchen Official Site

Roman Catholic Diocese of Metuchen
Francis of Assisi Metuchen
Roman Catholic churches in New Jersey
Gothic Revival church buildings in New Jersey
Churches in Middlesex County, New Jersey
Religious organizations established in 1878
Roman Catholic churches completed in 1963
Metuchen, New Jersey
20th-century Roman Catholic church buildings in the United States